Jerry Estrada (full name, Gerardo Hernández Estrada; born January 10, 1958, Monclova, Coahuila) is a semi-retired Mexican luchador (professional wrestler). For most of his career, he has portrayed a rudo (heel, those that portray the "bad guys") character, nicknamed "El Puma". His rudo persona was pattered on various Glam Rock bands, complete with colorful spandex and what was described as a "rock and roll" attitude in the ring. He was originally active from 1978 until 2003 when he was forced to retire due to chronic injures caused by his signature bumps outside the ring. Estrada began working select matches again in 2018.

Estrada was a major star for Empresa Mexicana de Lucha Libre (EMLL) during the 1980s but was one of the first wrestlers to leave EMLL to work for Antonio Peña's newly started Asistencia Asesoría y Administración (AAA) in 1992. He also had a brief run in the World Wrestling Federation (WWF) in 1997 and 1998 when AAA and WWF had a working agreement. From 1991 to 2008 Mini-Estrella Enrique del Rio worked under the ring name Jerrito Estrada, a mini version of Jerry Estrada.

Over the years Estrada has held a number of championships for both AAA and CMLL, including the Mexican National Light Heavyweight Championship, the CMLL World Light Heavyweight Championship, the Mexican National Middleweight Championship as well as the Mexican National Trios Championship with Hombre Bala and Pirata Morgan, collectively known as Los Bucaneros. He was in the main event of AAA's Triplemanía II-A show, losing a Lucha de Apuestas, or bet match, to Heavy Metal and was forced to have all his hair shaved off as a result.

Early life
Gerardo Hernández Estrada was born on January 10, 1958, in Monclova, part of the northern Mexican state of Coahuila. As a teenager, two local transit agents, who also worked part-time as professional wrestlers, offered to train Estrada but ended up breaking Estrada's foot during their first session by accident. While recovering Estrada worked to support himself by selling chewing gum, polishing shoes, driving tracks and working as a line chef. During his various jobs, he met professional wrestler Herodes, who started to train him alongside notable wrestling trainer Alberto Moras.

Professional wrestling career
After his initial training under Alberto Moras and Herodes, he would receive further training, early in his career by Rafael Salamanca, Gran Cochisse, Gori Medina Enrique Llanes, Ringo Mendoza, and Alfonso Dantés. In an interview with Estrada from around his 2003 retirement, he revealed that he briefly wrestled under a masked identity, using either the name "Guardián Blanco" ("White Guardian")  or "Halcón Blanco" ("White Falcon").

After unmasking, Estrada began working under the name Jerry Estrada, the only name he has used since 1978. He slowly developed a "rock and roll" style in-ring character, inspired by various early to mid-1980s bands. Where most wrestlers at the time wore more traditional wrestling tights and trunks Estrada opted to wear black or dark colored spandex with bright colored tassels and bandanas, similar to the onstage outfit worn by glam rockers such as Twisted Sister frontman Dee Snider. Ricardo Vega, a magazine publisher, coined the nickname "El Puma" for Estrada, a nickname Estrada had throughout his career. It led Estrada to sporadically walk to the ring with a living Puma.

EMLL/CMLL (1978–1992)
It was not long after making his in-ring debut that Jerry Estrada began working regularly for Empresa Mexicana de Lucha Libre (EMLL), the world's oldest and one of Mexico's largest wrestling promotions.
The company decided to make Estrada the next Mexican National Middleweight Champion, which happened on March 4, 1984, when he defeated Ultraman. Over the subsequent 273 days, he successfully defended the championship against Águila Solitaria, Cachorro Mendoza, Atlantis, and Mogur. Estrada was slated to wrestle at the EMLL 52nd Anniversary Show on September 20, but it was canceled due to the Mexico City earthquake the day before. On November 30, 1984, Atlantis defeated Jerry Estrada to win the Mexican National Middleweight Championship.

In 1986 EMLL decided to team Estrada up with Pirata Morgan and Hombre Bala to form a trio known as Los Bucaneros ("The Buccaneers") as part of its emerging Trios division. For his stint with Los Bucaneros, Estrada had his hair cut short and began wrestling wearing a faux eyepatch as part of the Pirate image. Los Bucaneros went on to defeat the trio of Kiss, Ringo Mendoza, and Rayo de Jalisco Jr. to win the Mexican National Trios Championship on August 30, 1987. Their reign ended when Los Destructores ("The Destroyers"; Tony Arce, Emilio Charles Jr., and Vulcano) were chosen by EMLL to become the next champions, taking the titles on January 31, 1988. Estrada departed Los Bucaneros not long after the title loss, being replaced on the team with El Verdungo. Estrada left the team because he wanted to shed the pirate image and return to the wrestling style of his "El Puma" character.

In 1990, EMLL created a Mini-Estrella ("Mini Star") division and several of the small-sized wrestlers were given ring characters matching the regular-sized wrestlers; one such wrestler was Jerrito Estrada (Spanish for "Little Jerry Estrada") who heavily physically resembled Estrada and had a similar wrestling style. While he was a smaller version of Jerry Estrada, EMLL's conservative booking style kept the regular-sized wrestlers and the Mini-Estrellas from appearing or wrestling together.

By late 1991, EMLL changed their name to Consejo Mundial de Lucha Libre (CMLL) and created a number of "World" championships to help usher in the new name; one such title was the CMLL World Light Heavyweight Championship. CMLL held a tournament in late 1991 that saw Jerry Estrada defeat MS-1, Mascara Año 2000 and Black Magic on his way to the finals, where he defeated Pierroth Jr. to become the first champion. Estrada held the championship for 175 days until Pierroth Jr. won it from him.

Asistencia Asesoría y Administración / AAA (1992–1997)
In early 1992, then-CMLL booker Antonio Peña decided to leave the conservative CMLL to create his own wrestling promotion, Asistencia Asesoría y Administración, later known as "AAA". Estrada was one of the first CMLL wrestlers to leave to join AAA, causing an exodus of a large number of CMLL wrestlers to AAA at the time. In AAA Jerry and Jerrito Estrada teamed up on several occasions, including the first-ever Triplemanía show on April 30, 1993, where Jerry, Jerrito and Blue Panther lost to rivals Máscara Sagrada, Mascarita Sagrada and Love Machine.

In 1994 Estrada became involved in a storyline feud with one of AAA's top tecnicos (good guys) Heavy Metal with the now veteran Estrada playing the role of the angry veteran wrestler who did not believe Heavy Metal was tough enough to be a top-level wrestler. The storyline between the two became the background for the main event of AAA's Triplemanía II-A, where Heavy Metal and Estrada faced off in a Lucha de Apuesta, or bet match. The original plan was for Heavy Metal to defeat Estrada at Triplemanía, but for unrevealed reasons Antonio Peña decided to change the finish of the match, booking Estrada to win instead. Estrada won the third fall of the match by disqualification as planned. Afterward, Heavy Metal got very emotional about the loss, the prospect of having his hair shaved off and his future in AAA, and started to cry and beg for the result to be nullified. At that point, Peña came to the ring to talk to Heavy Metal. At that point Peña had the match restarted and Heavy Metal won the final fall when Peña changed his mind on the outcome of the match. A visibly annoyed Estrada only had part of his hair cut off before he left the ring and went backstage.

Later that year Estrada represented AAA on the When Worlds Collide show, a joint AAA/World Championship Wrestling (WCW) pay-per-view where he paired with La Parka and Blue Panther, losing to the team of The Pegasus Kid, 2 Cold Scorpio, and Tito Santana. In March 1995 Estrada defeated La Parka to win the Mexican National Light Heavyweight Championship, holding it for 131 days before losing it back to La Parka. During his time as the champion, he successfully defended the title against Rey Misterio, Latin Lover, and Lizmark. In 1995 he also worked at two of the three Triplemanía shows held that year, first at Triplemanía III-A the team of Konnan, Perro Aguayo, La Parka and Octagón defeated Cien Caras, Máscara Año 2000, Pentagón and Jerry Estrada. Later on at Triplemanía III-C Estrada got a small measure of revenge as he teamed up with Cien Caras, Máscara Año 2000, and Fishman to defeat the team of Konnan, Perro Aguayo, Latin Lover, and Máscara Sagrada.

The following year he worked all three Triplemanía shows; first teaming up with Juventud Guerrera to defeat El Pantera and Super Caló at Triplemanía IV-A, then Estrada, El Sanguinario, and Arandu lost to Latin Lover, Sergio Romo Jr., and Antifaz at Triplemanía IV-B and finally Estrada, Fishman, Villano IV and May Flowers lost to La Parka, Winners, Super Caló and El Mexicano on the undercard of Triplemanía IV-C.

In early 1997 AAA began a working relationship with the North American-based World Wrestling Federation (WWF), with AAA sending several of their wrestlers to the US to work WWF shows. Estrada made his only WWF appearance when he worked a match at the 1997 Royal Rumble where he teamed up with Fuerza Guerrera and former rival Heavy Metal, losing to Héctor Garza, Perro Aguayo, and El Canek. Estrada was also one of the first participants in AAA's Rey de Reyes ("King of Kings") which would become an annual tournament. In the first round, Latin Lover outlasted Estrada, Máscara Sagrada Jr., and The Killer. At Triplemanía V-A Estrada teamed up with El Picudo to be one of four teams competing in a Luchas de Apuestas match. Estrada and his teammate survived the match without losing their hair, which ended with Leon Negro pinning Halcón Dorado Jr.

Promo Azteca / World Wrestling Council (1997–1998)
Up until 1997 AAA and Promo Azteca had been working closely together but the two groups split in early 1997 with Estrada being one of the AAA wrestlers that chose to work exclusively for Promo Azteca at the time. While Promo Azteca had a working arrangement with WCW, Estrada never appeared on a WCW show. During this time he also worked several tours for the Puerto Rico-based World Wrestling Council (WWC) where he was part of a group called La Invasión Azteca ("The Aztec Invasion") that also included Pierroth, Rico Suave and Villano III. In WWC he defeated Steve Corino on November 16, 1997, to win the WWC Junior Heavyweight Championship. 27 days later he lost the title to local wrestler La Ley but regained it on January 6, 1998. After 221 days as the Junior Heavyweight Champion Estrada lost the title to El Rockero, ending his time with WWC shortly afterward.

AAA (1998–2003)
Estrada returned to AAA in 1998, working with them especially when they toured through Monterrey. On December 8, 2000, Estrada teamed up with The Headhunters to wrestle on AAA's 2000 Guerra de Titans show. The trio lost to the veteran trio of El Canek, Dos Caras and Máscara Sagráda. A year later, on September 16, 2001, Estrada, Pirata Morgan, El Texano, and El Engendro lost to La Parka Jr., Máscara Sagrada, Sangre Chicana, and Octagón on the undercard of the 2001 Verano de Escándalo show.

On September 4, 2002, Estrada and Misterioso were teamed up for a storyline feud with Enfermero Jr. and Pimpinela Escarlata that led to Estrada and Misterioso having all their hair shaved off as a result of losing a Lucha de Apuestas match. A month later Estrada faced the masked Espectro Jr. in a Lucha de Apuestas match that Estrada won and, As a consequence, Espectro Jr. removed the wig instead of actually unmasking. His last match for AAA took place on March 23, 2003, and saw Estrada, Héctor Garza, and Pimpinela Escarlata lose to Dos Caras Jr., El Hijo del Solitario, and Perro Aguayo Jr.

Retirement and return (2003–present)
In mid-2003, Estrada announced that his physical condition would force him to retire. Over the years Estrada had become known for a move known as Salida de Bandera ("the Exit Sign") where he would be thrown over the top rope with great height and crash to the floor. While professional wrestling is a staged event and his opponents would do their best to protect Estrada the years of hitting the floor took a toll on his body and he was forced to retire. On May 25, 2003, Jerry Estrada teamed up with former rival Pierroth and Super Crazy, losing his retirement match to the team of Perro Aguayo Jr., Tinieblas and Villano III. In mid-2009 the Perros del Mal wrestling promotion held a benefit show for Jerry Estrada, with a portion of the proceeds going to Estrada. It was later revealed that Estrada was confined to a wheelchair for years after his retirement due to compounding back and knee injuries.

Later that year a Monterrey wrestling promotion known as Poder y Honor held a second benefit show to honor Jerry Estrada. In subsequent years Estrada improved his health through both rehabilitation and treatment enough to the point where he was able to participate in a match. On December 12, 2012, Estrada teamed up with Jerrito Estrada and a wrestler known as "Ricky Estrada" to defeat the team of longtime rival Stuka, Octagoncito, and La Parkita in what was billed as his "retirement match". On August 8, 2013, Jerry Estrada came out of retirement for one more match, headlining a show billed as "Jerry Estrada's Retirement Show". Jerry Estrada, Gato Fantasma, and Silencio defeated Memo, Rey Demonio Jr., and Stuka. By 2018 Estrada's health and mobility had improved to the point that he competed in a total of five matches that year, including his first match in Arena Mexico for 26 years as he teamed up with veteran wrestlers Negro Casas and Fuerza Guerrera as the trio lost to El Felino, Mano Negra and El Solar on the Máscara Año 2000 40th Anniversary Show.

Championships and accomplishments
Asistencia Asesoría y Administración / AAA
Mexican National Light Heavyweight Championship (1 time)
IWAS World Tag Team Championship (1 time) – with Juventud Guerrera
Consejo Mundial de Lucha Libre / Empresa Mexicana de Lucha Libre
CMLL World Light Heavyweight Championship (1 time)
Mexican National Middleweight Championship (1 time)
Mexican National Trios Championship (1 time) – with Hombre Bala and Pirata Morgan
International Wrestling All-Stars
IWAS Tag Team Championship (1 time) – with Juventud Guerrera
World Wrestling Council
WWC World Junior Heavyweight Championship (2 times)
Pro Wrestling Illustrated
PWI ranked him # 75 of the 500 best singles wrestlers of the PWI 500 in 1998.

Luchas de Apuestas record

Footnotes

References

1958 births
Living people
Mexican male professional wrestlers
Sportspeople from Monclova
Professional wrestlers from Coahuila
Mexican National Middleweight Champions
Mexican National Trios Champions
20th-century professional wrestlers
21st-century professional wrestlers
CMLL World Light Heavyweight Champions
Mexican National Light Heavyweight Champions